Billy Beckett was a Scottish footballer who played as an outside left.

Career
Beckett began his career with Scottish junior club Renfrew. In 1951, he signed for Rangers, making his only league appearance on 10 March 1951 in a 4–0 victory against Clyde. Beckett subsequently joined English Kent League club Ashford Town. In 1955, he signed for Scottish club Cowdenbeath where he remained for two seasons, scoring over 20 goals for the club. In August 1957, Beckett signed for Chelmsford City, following offers from Football League clubs Halifax Town, Darlington and Crewe Alexandra. After 13 appearances for Chelmsford, scoring five goals, he returned to his native Scotland after failing to secure accommodation in Chelmsford.

References

Possibly living people
Date of birth missing
Year of birth missing
Date of death missing
Year of death missing
Association football wingers
Scottish footballers
Sportspeople from Dumbarton
Footballers from West Dunbartonshire
Rangers F.C. players
Renfrew F.C. players
Ashford United F.C. players
Cowdenbeath F.C. players
Chelmsford City F.C. players
Scottish Junior Football Association players
Scottish Football League players
Kent Football League (1894–1959) players